Blagica Pop Tomova (born 1977) is an operatic soprano from North Macedonia. She was born in Štip in 1977. She completed high school in Skopje (1991–1995), where she received solo singing tuition from Marija Nikolovska. She studied with Biljana J. Jovanovska at the Skopje Music Academy, and completed her Master's degree in 2012. She has also studied singing with Arturo Sergey, Lorus Gai, James Lomis, Gondola Novak, Kurt Raft and Tolandro Rousseau.

She has performed with the orchestra in Altenburg, Germany, Orchestra of Macedonian Philharmonic, a small chamber orchestra in Paris, France, Days of Macedonian Music, Stip Cultural Summer, Skopje cultural Summer, Ohrid cultural Summer, first performance of Wagner with Macedonian Philharmonic - conductor Tim Tchashel, 7 December 1998, 28 May 1999.

She debuted at Macedonian opera scene at 27 May Opera Evenings with the small role of Ines in the opera Trovatore. In 2001, she became a member of the Macedonian Opera and Ballet with leading roles in the operas Cavalleria Rusticana, Carmen, Tosca and Turandot. She has since appeared in the major roles of Santuca in Cavalleria Rusticana, Mikaela in Carmen, Tosca in Tosca, Madame Glavari in Merry Widow, Liu in Turandot, Dona Ana in Don Juan, Eurydice in Orpheus and Eurydice, Silva Varesku in Duchess Chardshot, and Violeta Glavari in La Traviata.

In 2009 she became an assistant professor of solo singing University "Goce Delčev" at the Music Academy in Štip.

As an active artist follow performances in Dubrovnik evenings with a gala opera concert in Dubrovnik, as well as regular Opera presented in London, prepare for role Margarita from the opera Faust.

Significant concerts 
 2011/12 - Opening May Opera Evenings.
 2011 - opening season Philharmonic Mahler 2nd Symphony, the opening of the opera season with Orfeo ed Euridice.
 2012 - Opening Ohrid Summer with multi medial project Romeo and Juliet.

References

21st-century Macedonian women singers
Living people
1977 births
Musicians from Skopje
People from Štip
Operatic sopranos